Huang Shixiang (born 1934) is a Chinese Beijing opera singer best known for his performances in "Jade River" Taijun Cichao (太君辭朝) and Hongzong Liema (紅鬃烈馬). His father, Pugong, was the son of Zaixun, a Manchu prince of the late Qing dynasty. Had the empire not been abolished, this would have made him fourth in line to the throne as of 2023, behind Jin Yuzhang and his brothers. 

Huang has gone to some lengths to conceal his imperial ancestry. Rather than his father's family name Aisin Gioro or its Chinese form Jin, he goes by the maiden name of his mother Huang Yongni (stage name Xue Yanqin), who was also a famous Beijing opera actress. He is likewise registered as a member of his mother's Hui Chinese ethnic group rather than as a Manchu.

References

Living people
Manchu male actors
Manchu singers
1955 births
20th-century Chinese male actors
21st-century Chinese male actors
20th-century Chinese  male  singers
21st-century Chinese  male singers
Male actors from Beijing
Singers from Beijing
Chinese male Peking opera actors